Phyllocnistis baccharidis is a moth of the family Gracillariidae, known from Argentina. The hostplant for the species is an unidentified species of Baccharis.

References

Phyllocnistis
Endemic fauna of Argentina
Moths of South America